The 1904 United States elections elected the members of the 59th United States Congress. It occurred during the Fourth Party System. Republicans maintained control of the Presidency and both houses of Congress. For the first time since the 1828 election, no third party or independent won a seat in Congress.

In the Presidential election, Republican President Theodore Roosevelt defeated Democratic judge Alton Parker from New York. Parker, a conservative Bourbon Democrat, won the Democratic nomination on the first ballot, as former President Grover Cleveland and former presidential nominee William Jennings Bryan both declined to run. Roosevelt dominated both the popular vote and the electoral college, carrying every state outside the South. Roosevelt, who succeeded William McKinley after the latter was assassinated in 1901, became the first vice president to succeed to the presidency and later win election to the presidency in his own right. The election also saw Florida hold the first presidential primary, although Florida delegates were not bound by the results of the primary.

Republicans won major gains in the House, boosting their majority.

In the Senate, the Republicans picked up one seat, and maintained a commanding majority.

See also
1904 United States presidential election
1904 United States House of Representatives elections
1904–05 United States Senate elections
1904 United States gubernatorial elections

References

1904 elections in the United States
1904